A Perfect Day is a 2006 American made-for-television drama film directed by Peter Levin and written by Joyce Eliason. It is based on the 2003 novel A Perfect Day by Richard Paul Evans. The film stars Rob Lowe, Frances Conroy, Paget Brewster, Christopher Lloyd, Jude Ciccolella and Rowena King. The film premiered on TNT on December 18, 2006.

Plot
Rob is a man who lives a miserable life made of sacrifices with his family. The turning point comes when he finally decides to publish a book inspired by the moving experience of his father-in-law's death. At first his book will not get great fame but later Rob will find himself having to travel around the world submerged by important conferences and meetings with curious readers and authors. This unfortunately will lead him to put his loved ones in the background and to separate from his wife. To bring him back down to earth will be an elderly gentleman who will point out to him what he is losing, foreseeing his near death. Therefore, he will no longer be able to reconcile with his family if he does not put his interests aside. This man looks like an angel sent by God to get Rob back on the right path. Later it will be discovered that the alleged angel is in truth an ordinary mortal, but a very important element for the story, without which the protagonist would no longer be able to get close to his loved ones. The film ends with a pleasant happy ending: Rob hugs his wife and beloved daughter again, after asking for forgiveness from his abandoned father for years.

Cast 
Rob Lowe as Rob Harlan
Frances Conroy as Camille
Paget Brewster as Allyson Harlan
Christopher Lloyd as Michael
Jude Ciccolella as Chuck
Rowena King as Heather
Kevin Dunn as Darren
Meggie Geisland as Carson Harlan
Mike Pniewski as Stuart Parks
Damon Lipari as Stan Harlan
Candi Brooks as Stacey
Lauren Fain as Marla
Michael Arata as Concerned Man 
Jerry Leggio as Old Man
Janet Shea as Aunt Denise
Lara Grice as Reporter #1
John Valdetero as Ted Sterling
Larry King as Himself

References

External links
 

2006 drama films
2006 television films
2006 films
American drama television films
Films about families
Films about writers
TNT Network original films
2000s English-language films
Films directed by Peter Levin
2000s American films